Mumuni Abubakar (born 17 May 1993) is a Ghanaian football midfielder who currently plays for Black Leopards.

References

1993 births
Living people
Ghanaian footballers
Black Leopards F.C. players
Stellenbosch F.C. players
Free State Stars F.C. players
Richards Bay F.C. players
Royal Eagles F.C. players
South African Premier Division players
National First Division players
Association football midfielders
Ghanaian expatriate footballers
Expatriate soccer players in South Africa
Ghanaian expatriate sportspeople in South Africa